Champtoceaux is a former commune in the Maine-et-Loire department of western France. On 15 December 2015, it was merged into the new commune Orée-d'Anjou.

History
Champtoceaux name derives from Latin Castrum Sellense.
Inhabitants are called Castrocelsiens today.

Twin towns
 Verwood in East Dorset, England.
 Niederheimbach in the Mainz-Bingen Kreis of Germany.
 Calcinato in the province of Brescia, in the Lombardy region of Italy

See also
Communes of the Maine-et-Loire department

References

External links

Official town site
Official town site (in English)

Former communes of Maine-et-Loire